Boumedfaâ District is a district of Aïn Defla Province, Algeria.

Municipalities
The district is further divided into two municipalities.
Boumedfaâ
Hoceinia

References

Districts of Aïn Defla Province